Roland Gunther Linz (born 9 August 1981) is an Austrian former professional footballer who played as a forward.

He spent most of his extensive professional career with Austria Wien, winning five major titles including three Austrian Bundesliga championships. He also competed in France, Portugal, Turkey and Thailand.

Linz earned 39 caps for Austria, appearing for the nation at Euro 2008.

Club career

Early career and Germany
Born in Leoben, Styria, Linz started in the youth teams of local DSV Leoben. Aged 15, he left for Germany to finish his football development on Bavaria with TSV 1860 München.

Two years later, Linz returned to Austria to rejoin his hometown club, this time being featured in the professional squad. Over the two following seasons, he scored 27 goals in 53 games combined, and his good form in the second division attracted the attention of bigger sides in the country, which led to him signing with FK Austria Wien.

Linz had his first taste of success at his new team, winning both the Bundesliga and cup in the 2002–03 campaign. One year later, he moved on loan to VfB Admira Wacker Mödling, located in the southern outskirts of the capital.

Second move abroad and return
Linz left Austria for the second time in 2004, joining Ligue 1 club OGC Nice on loan. However, he failed to establish himself and returned home after just six months, to play for SK Sturm Graz until the end of the season.

Linz then returned to Austria Wien for a final campaign, which again ended with the double as the player was crowned league top scorer. It was around this time that he established himself in the national team, with two goals in a 2–3 defeat against Poland at the Silesian Stadium in Chorzów in the 2006 FIFA World Cup qualifiers.

Portugal and later years
After excellent performances for both club and country, interest in Linz's services increased, and he eventually joined Boavista F.C. during the 2006 summer, on a three-year contract. He finished his debut season with ten Primeira Liga goals, and subsequently moved to S.C. Braga.

In the 2007–08 UEFA Cup, Linz netted five goals before his team was eventually ousted by SV Werder Bremen, and added 11 in the league, relegating veteran goal-getter João Tomás to the bench as Braga finished seventh and again reached the UEFA Cup, through the UEFA Intertoto Cup.

After a run-in with manager Jorge Jesus, following a substitution during a 0–2 loss at Leixões S.C. in September 2008, Linz lost his importance in the Braga squad and, on 30 January 2009, signed for Grasshopper Club Zürich on loan until June. In his first competitive fixture for his new club, in the local derby against FC Zürich, he scored but was also sent off after two yellow cards, in the 39th and 41st minutes.

Linz joined Gaziantepspor during the 2009 summer on a three-year contract, moving alongside Braga teammate Jorginho. In January 2010, however, he returned to his country and Austria Vienna, scoring on his debut – a 4–3 home win against Kapfenberger SV – to make the Bundesliga Team of the Week.

In 2013, Linz switched teams and countries again, after agreeing to a transfer to Muangthong United F.C. in the Thai Premier League. He netted his first official goal on 30 March, contributing to a 3–0 win over Songkhla United FC.

International career
Linz made his debut for Austria in a friendly match with Slovakia, a 2–0 win in Graz on 27 March 2002. He remained a regular until September 2007, when he made a public outburst against Austrian Football Association president Friedrich Stickler which meant that, for the next 18 months, he was cast into the international wilderness.

Linz returned to the national side in time for UEFA Euro 2008 on home soil, starting in the first two of Austria's matches during the tournament but finishing goalless as the nation crashed out at the first hurdle.

Career statistics

Club

Honours
Austria Wien
Austrian Bundesliga: 2002–03, 2005–06, 2012–13
Austrian Cup: 2002–03, 2005–06

Braga
UEFA Intertoto Cup: 2008

Individual
 Austrian Bundesliga top scorer: 2005–06, 2010–11

References

External links
Austria Wien archives 

National team data 

1981 births
Living people
People from Leoben
Austrian footballers
Association football forwards
Austrian Football Bundesliga players
2. Liga (Austria) players
FK Austria Wien players
FC Admira Wacker Mödling players
SK Sturm Graz players
Ligue 1 players
OGC Nice players
Primeira Liga players
Boavista F.C. players
S.C. Braga players
C.F. Os Belenenses players
Swiss Super League players
Grasshopper Club Zürich players
Süper Lig players
Gaziantepspor footballers
Roland Linz
Roland Linz
Austria international footballers
UEFA Euro 2008 players
Austrian expatriate footballers
Expatriate footballers in France
Expatriate footballers in Portugal
Expatriate footballers in Switzerland
Expatriate footballers in Turkey
Expatriate footballers in Thailand
Austrian expatriate sportspeople in Portugal
Footballers from Styria
Austrian expatriate sportspeople in Switzerland
Austrian expatriate sportspeople in Thailand
Austrian expatriate sportspeople in France
Austrian expatriate sportspeople in Turkey
Expatriate footballers in Germany
Austrian expatriate sportspeople in Germany
TSV 1860 Munich players